Lord British, or Lord Cantabrigian British, is the fictional ruler of Britannia, a kingdom in the fictional world of Sosaria, created by Richard Garriott for his video game series Ultima. Garriott himself is also known to his fans as Lord British.

Origin of the name

Ultima series creator Richard Garriott acquired the nickname "British" as a teenager from friends at computer camp who claimed his greeting to them, "Hello", was distinct from the usual American "Hi". The Lord title was later added when he played as dungeon master in his Dungeons & Dragons games.

When his first published game Akalabeth was released, the president of the publishing company suggested he use the name in the game, since it was more memorable than his real name.

Garriott released Akalabeth: World of Doom and all other Ultima games under the pseudonym, and occasionally appeared in Ultima Online playing as Lord British and meting out justice to his players. He is still known as Lord British. Garriott retained the trademark rights to the name Lord British with its associated symbols, and the character appears in his game Tabula Rasa as General British.

Origins of the character in the Ultima games
Neither the Avatar nor Lord British are born in Sosaria, but come from Earth via the moongates. When British comes to Sosaria, the character Mondain, an evil wizard, is still young. They have a battle where British is victorious, driving Mondain away from the kingdom. In Ultima I Mondain seeks revenge. A stranger (who will become the Avatar) deals with Mondain this time, but three-fourths of the world mysteriously disappears for causes unknown.

Numerous plotlines and side quests in the Ultima games revolve around Lord British's adventures or public works projects. In the games, he has a key role in founding the Museum, Conservatory and other institutions of the Britannian society.

In the Ultima series
In the Ultima series, Lord British rules from his throne inside Castle Britannia, and continuously provides healing, resurrection and other miscellaneous help for the Avatar (the main character) and his adventuring party. In the first three Ultima games, British charged a significant sum of money for his services, but would provide them for free from Ultima IV onwards.

Throughout the Ultima series, Lord British never leaves his castle, except for Ultima V, where his absence constitutes the main storyline, and at the end of Ultima VI, when he uses a red moongate to travel to the Isle of the Avatar. Instead, he relies on heroes like the Avatar to go forth and correct the various crises that crop up in Britannia. In Ultima IX, the Guardian comments on this behavior, accusing Lord British of always hiding in his castle while his land suffers. In the climax of the same game, Lord British finally ventures outside the confines of his castle to help the Avatar in a final showdown with Lord Blackthorn.

Assassination of Lord British

One of the most famous attributes of Lord British is that he is almost invincible. In every Ultima game in which he has appeared, he is designed to be almost impervious to a player's character predations. However, there are ways for a player thinking outside the box to assassinate him.

This phenomenon is the origin of the Lord British Postulate which states: "If it exists as a living creature in an MMORPG, someone, somewhere, will try to kill it." Virtually every MMO game displays numerous instances of this, with players attempting to kill (or, in the case of friendly NPCs, cause the death of) virtually every NPC or monster, howsoever powerful, meek, friendly, or ethereal.

 Lord British was killed during an in-game appearance on Ultima Online'''s beta test on August 9, 1997. A royal visit was conducted as a part of server population stress test. A player character known as Rainz casts a spell called "fire field" on Lord British that, surprisingly, kills him. According to Starr Long, the whole thing was just a human error: Lord British's character, like others, had been made invulnerable, but by design the invulnerability did not persist over several game sessions. Shortly before the incident, the server had crashed, and Richard Garriott had forgotten to set his invulnerability flag on when logging on again. Shortly afterwards, Rainz's account was banned from the beta test for previously exploiting bugs rather than reporting them (frequently used by his character Aquaman to kill many player characters, a purported griefing incident). According to Origin, he was not banned for the assassination but rather for previous complaints against his account that were brought to light as a result of this attention. After Lord British was killed, fellow Ultima Online developer Starr Long (also known in game as Lord Blackthorn) summoned some demons, who attacked innocent bystanders. This led to beta testers protesting both the indiscriminate killing, and the banning of the assassin. MMOCrunch calls it the most memorable event in MMORPG History. According to Wired magazine:

In Ultima III: Exodus, according to interviewer Shay Addams, "Garriott was less than pleased" that some players had found a way to kill Lord British. He had taken steps to safeguard his character from being attacked in the game. While no weapon a player had on them could harm him, he could be killed if chased to the docks and killed with one of the cannons there.
In Ultima IV: Quest of the Avatar, a player could cast a spell to create a lava field that damaged Lord British slightly. With enough patience and shuffling back and forth, Lord British could be killed. It was also possible to damage him enough with the 'Tremor' spell that he would flee, although this required some luck (depending upon, among other things, what random number of hit points he was assigned when battle began). Lord British, unlike every other town character, was impervious to the destructive use of the Skull of Mondain.
 In Ultima V: Warriors of Destiny, Lord British appears only in dream and vision sequences and in the endgame – none of which allow the input of normal commands, so that there is no way to kill him.
In Ultima VI: The False Prophet, there were at least four ways in which Lord British could be killed: (a) if a player dragged a poison trap to British's throne and detonated it, British was poisoned and slowly lost health until he eventually died; (b) while asleep, he could be killed with a glass sword; (c) filling Lord British's throne room with powder kegs, igniting one, and standing clear of the blasts was sufficient to kill him; or (d) using a pickpocket spell to steal the wand Lord British would use to instantly kill the player when attacked; the wand could also kill Lord British.
In Ultima VII, an Easter egg allows British to be killed. If the player double-clicks the gold plaque above the castle gate when British is standing directly underneath (which he invariably does at exactly noon each day), the plaque will fall on his head. The player can arrange several chairs or crates around him in such a way as to trap him underneath the plaque. This was inspired by an incident at the Origin building: a metal bar, attached to the door by a magnet, fell on Garriott's head, warranting a visit to the hospital. One of the characters says "Yancey-Hausman will pay!", which is a reference to the owner and landlord of the building. British could also be killed by The Black Sword found in the game's expansion pack, Forge of Virtue.
In Ultima VII Part Two: Serpent Isle, Lord British can only be encountered in the dream world in Gorlab Swamp, surveying the ruins of his destroyed castle. While death in the dream world does not actually kill the individual, the player may "kill" British using the armor and Infinity Bow found in the castle. He will make a saddened comment and disappear.
Lord British does not appear in Ultima VIII.
Another Easter egg enables the player to kill British in Ultima IX: Ascension. When the game begins in the Avatar's house, it is possible for the player to cook a loaf of poison bread. If this bread is brought to Britannia and switched with Lord British's regular meal, Lord British will eventually eat it and die.

Professor Megan Winget of the University of Texas, coordinator of a project to study the best way to preserve video game history, stated in a BBC interview that the death of Lord British in the Ultima games is something people remember and are affected by:

Reception
In a 2021 list published by PC Gamer'' staff, Lord British is ranked among the most iconic characters in PC gaming.

References

The Official Book of Ultima by Shay Addams.

External links
CVG article about the many deaths of Lord British
Reuters article about Lord British returning as General British in Tabula Rasa

Fictional kings
Male characters in video games
Science fantasy video game characters
Ultima characters
Video game characters based on real people
Video game characters introduced in 1981